POV (also written P.O.V.) is a Public Broadcasting Service (PBS) public television series which features independent nonfiction films. POV is an initialism for point of view.

POV is the longest-running showcase on television for independent documentary films. PBS presents 14–16 POV programs each year, and the series has premiered over 400 films to U.S. television audiences since 1988. POVs films have a strong first-person, social-issue focus. Many established directors, including Michael Moore, Jonathan Demme, Terry Zwigoff, Errol Morris, Albert and David Maysles, Michael Apted, Frederick Wiseman, Marlon Riggs, and Ross McElwee have had work screened as part of the POV series.

The series has garnered both critical and industry acclaim over its 30+ years on television. POV films have won every major film and broadcasting award including 45 Emmys, 26 George Foster Peabody Awards, 15 duPont-Columbia Awards, three Academy Awards, three George Polk Documentary Film Awards and the Prix Italia. POV and America ReFramed are projects of the independent non-profit, American Documentary, Inc.

Episodes

Reception 
Richard Roeper of Chicago Sun-Times wrote for the episode, 'And She Could Be Next', "Powerful and absolutely vital."

See also
 Independent Lens (PBS series)

References

External links
 POV official site
 
 American Documentary, Inc. (series production company)

1988 American television series debuts
1980s American documentary television series
1990s American documentary television series
2000s American documentary television series
2010s American documentary television series
2020s American documentary television series
PBS original programming
Peabody Award-winning television programs